Living Legend(s) may refer to:

Film and television 
 "The Living Legend", a 1978 episode of Battlestar Galactica
 "Living Legend" (CSI), a 2006 episode of CSI: Crime Scene Investigation
 Living Legend (audio drama), an audio drama based on Doctor Who
 Living Legends (film), a 2014 Bulgarian film

Music 
 Living Legends (group), an American hip hop group
 Living Legends (BYU), a performing arts group at Brigham Young University

Albums
 Living Legend (Art Pepper album), 1975
 Living Legend (Gunplay album), 2015
 Living Legend: Certified D-Boy, by Master P, 2005
 A Living Legend, by Mother Maybelle Carter, 1965
 Living Legends (album), by 8Ball & MJG, 2004
 Living Legend, by Bo Diddley, 1989
 Living Legend, by Roland Rat
 Living Legend, by Seikima-II, 1999

Nicknames 
 Bruno Sammartino (1935-2018), Italian professional wrestler
 Larry Zbyszko (born 1951), American professional wrestler

Other uses
 Living Legend (attraction), a former tourist attraction on the Island of Jersey (British Isles)
 Living Legends (charity), an Australian facility for retired race horses
 Library of Congress Living Legend, an award for creative contributions to American life
 Living legend (person), a person who is famous while still living for doing something extremely well
 MechWarrior: Living Legends, a BattleTech video game mod